Wirquin is a French plastics company of plumbing fittings; it is a leader in European countries. The company has around 2300 employees, and six manufacturing sites.

History
The company was formed in 1977 as Wirquin Plastiques S.A. in Carquefou, in the Pays de la Loire region of western France.

In 2011 it bought CME Sanitary Systems in Doncaster in South Yorkshire, becoming Wirquin Limited. This is a manufacturing site, with around two hundred employees, with around 180 in manufacturing.

See also
 Comité Européen de l'Industrie de la Robinetterie

References

External links
Wirquin UK Website
Wirquin Group Website
Bathroom Fitter Website
Luxury Bathroom Shop

Bathroom fixture companies
Companies based in Doncaster
Companies based in Pays de la Loire
French companies established in 1977
Manufacturing companies established in 1977
Plastics companies of France